Leslie Potter (23 October 1907 – 13 May 1971) was a British rower. He competed in the men's coxed four event at the 1928 Summer Olympics.

References

External links
 

1907 births
1971 deaths
British male rowers
Olympic rowers of Great Britain
Rowers at the 1928 Summer Olympics
Place of birth missing